Pegasus Bay is a family owned and operated vineyard and winery based in Waipara, New Zealand.

Pegasus Bay winery is the second largest winery in Canterbury and considered within the New Zealand wine industry as a standard setter for the industry in the region and rated 'Canterburys top winery' by Michael Cooper in the Wine Atlas of New Zealand 2003. 
The winery was set up by Ivan Donaldson in 1986 and run by his family. Mr Donaldson is also the wine columnist for The Press newspaper in Christchurch.

Wine styles
Pegusus Bay produce:

 Sauvignon blanc/Semillon
 Pinot noir
 Merlot Cabernet
 Riesling
 Chardonnay

See also
New Zealand wine
Pegasus Bay

References

Sources
Fine wines of New Zealand 
Pegasus Bay Vineyards
Winestate Magazine 

1986 establishments in New Zealand
Canterbury, New Zealand
Wineries of New Zealand